The 1973 AMA Motocross Championship season was the 2nd AMA Motocross National Championship season.

Summary
The sport of motocross experienced explosive growth in 1973 and motorcycle manufacturers sought to capitalize on the expanding market with all four Japanese manufacturers fielding factory-backed teams alongside their European counterparts. Pierre Karsmakers from the Netherlands dominated the 1973 500cc national championship, winning seven of 12 AMA Nationals and claimed 17 victories in 36 races overall. Karsmakers is credited with helping raise the level of American motocross by stressing the importance of physical fitness and machine preparation. 1973 marked a turning point in American motocross when Jimmy Weinert became the first American rider to defeat the then-dominant European riders in the Trans-AMA Motocross Series at Lake Whitney Ranch in Texas. His victory showed that the level of American motocross had begun to compare with the level of European motocross.

As in the 1973 season, after the season-ending 500cc race on September 9, American riders competing for the AMA national championship continued to accumulate points counting towards the national championship while they competed in the 1973 Trans-AMA motocross series which began on September 23rd and hosted visiting European riders from the Motocross World Championship. Although Karsmakers was a Dutch citizen, he was competing under an AMA license so, he was listed as the "Top American" finisher in the Trans-AMA series.

After winning the 1972 250cc national championship on a Yamaha, Gary Jones was hired by Honda to help develop their new Honda CR250M motocross bike for the 1973 season. He did so successfully to win his second consecutive 250cc national title.

Nationals

500cc

Trans-AMA Series

250cc

Final standings

References

External links
 AMA Motocross web site 
 Motocross National Championship web site 

AMA Motocross Championship Season
AMA Motocross Championship Season
AMA Motocross Championship